Acacia rostellata is a shrub of the genus Acacia and the subgenus Phyllodineae that is endemic to south western Australia

Description
The low, spreading pungent shrub typically grows to a height of  it usually has many branches with pungent and hairy branchlets. Like most species of Acacia it has phyllodes rather than true leaves. It blooms from August to November and produces green-yellow flowers.

Distribution
It is native to an area in the Wheatbelt, Goldfields-Esperance and Great Southern regions of Western Australia growing in sand, sandy gravel or clay soils. It has a scattered distribution from around Bruce Rock in the north down to near Ongerup in the south  and out as far as Lake King and Speddingup in the east. It is usually part of the heath under-storey open Eucalyptus scrubland communities.

See also
List of Acacia species

References

rostellata
Acacias of Western Australia
Taxa named by Bruce Maslin
Plants described in 1999